Åslund, Aaslund, or Aslund is a Swedish surname. Notable people with the surname include:

Acke Åslund
Anders Åslund (born 1952), Swedish economist
Lars-Göran Åslund (born 1945), Swedish cross-country skier
Per Åslund (born 1986), professional Swedish ice hockey player
Martin Åslund, Swedish professional association football player
Sanny Åslund, Swedish football (soccer) coach 
Tobias Åslund, Swedish ski-orienteering competitor

Swedish-language surnames